Make Them Die Slowly is the second studio album by White Zombie, released on March 22, 1989, by Caroline Records. It is named after the 1981 horror film Cannibal Ferox, which was originally released in the US as Make Them Die Slowly. There is a printing error on the CD's side saying "Let Them Die Slowly" instead of the album's correct title. Produced by composer Bill Laswell and featuring John Ricci on guitar, the album represented a transition from the noise rock influenced sound of White Zombie's previous releases to heavy metal, which informed much of their later work.

Recording
White Zombie entered the studio in early 1988 to record the follow-up to Soul-Crusher, intending to release their next album by June. Since their previous release the band had started embracing a more heavy metal influenced sound, which they wanted to capture in recording their new album. They recorded sixteen songs over the course of four days but decided against releasing any of the finished material due to its similarity with their previous output. Guitarist Tom Guay left the band during this time and was replaced with John Ricci. The new line-up switched to a larger recording venue and attempted to re-record the material but ran out of the funds necessary to complete the album.

Iggy Pop, who was an admirer of their last album, recommended that the band finish recording with producer and composer Bill Laswell. Laswell opted to record the album from scratch at Platinum Island studio in New York City. The final guitar overdubs, vocals and mixing were done with Martin Bisi, at his studio in Gowanus, Brooklyn, New York. The band was critical of Laswell's production, with Sean saying, "it sounds like a tin can to me, with a muffled non-existent bass." In a 2010 interview, she recalled her experience recording the album:

Some of the songs cut from the release are "Dead Ringer", "Freak War", "Punishment Park", "Scum Kill II", and "Star Slammer". Guitarist John Ricci exited the band the day the record was completed having been diagnosed with carpal tunnel syndrome.

Music
The album displays change from the punk-influenced noise rock of their earlier albums to a sound more reminiscent of thrash metal. Rob has claimed "[W]e fell into the noise scene by accident" and that "[A]fter a while we got fed up and didn't want to have anything to do with it. We tried to move away from it consciously". Although he had previously disliked the heavy metal scene, Rob's opinion changed after borrowing Metallica's Ride the Lightning from drummer Ivan de Prume. Sean has cited both Metallica and Slayer as being highly influential to the band during this time. In an interview with Creem Presents: Thrash Metal, Sean suggested that "the new stuff is pretty close to being metal", while Rob claimed, "I don't know if you'd really call it 'metal' but there's a lot more focus to it. The songs are more like... songs."

Reception

Because of the shift in musical style critics usually review the album less favorably than the band's previous efforts, citing it as being too derivative and lacking in good production values. AllMusic staff writer Eduardo Rivadavia gave the record two and a half stars, saying that "although Make Them Die Slowly actually contained most of the key musical ingredients responsible for Sexorcistos subsequent breakthrough", the album "leaves much to be desired by subsequent standards". In a retrospective review, the Trouser Press wrote "there are traces of the old art-damage – most perceptibly on the plodding 'Godslayer', which is well-steeped in Funhouse-era Stoogery – but producer Bill Laswell keeps the band on track".

However, some fans tend to enjoy this release more as the album more closely resembles the sound that would dominate much of White Zombie's later career. David Sprague of Spin Magazine gave it an enthusiastic review, saying "Make Them Die Slowly might not be the metal LP to end all metal LPs, but it's damned likely to give you more nightmares and chuckles than anything else money can buy you these days". Sprague also gave the production uncommon praise, writing that Laswell "brings with him the simultaneously thin and heavy sound he's so fond of (c.f. Motörhead's Orgasmatron), and works wonders with it".

Track listing

Personnel
Adapted from the Make Them Die Slowly liner notes.

White Zombie
 Rob Zombie – vocals, illustrations
 John Ricci – guitar
 Sean Yseult – bass guitar
 Ivan de Prume – drums

Production and additional personnel
 Martin Bisi – engineering, mixing
 Oz Fritz – assistant engineering
 Bill Laswell – production
 Robert Musso – additional engineering
 Nicky Skopelitis – programming
 Artie Smith – technician
 Howie Weinberg – mastering

Release history

References

External links 
 

White Zombie (band) albums
1989 albums
Caroline Records albums
Albums produced by Bill Laswell